Baudó Emberá also known as Baudó is an Embera language of Colombia. It is partially intelligible with both Northern Embera and Eperara, and it is not clear which branch of Embera it belongs to.

Notes

Choco languages
Languages of Colombia
Indigenous languages of the South American Northwest